Bijeljina is a city and municipality in Bosnia and Herzegovina. It is the provincial center of Semberija, a geographic region in the country's northeast. Administratively, Bijeljina is part of the Republika Srpska entity. As of 2013, it has a population of 107,715 inhabitants. Ljubiša Savić, the commander of the Garda Panteri was born and assassinated here.

Geography
Bijeljina is located in Bosnia and Herzegovina's northeast, bound by the Sava and Drina rivers, extending over the Majevica mountains and covering a land mass of 734 km2. It is a part of the entity of Republika Srpska and is the center of the Semberija region. Semberija is a flat region with a fertile land ideal for agriculture. Due to this, Bijeljina is a major place for food production and trade, particularly wheat and vegetables.

History

Prehistory and Antiquity
The earliest established evidence of human life in the area of today's Bijeljina date from the New Stone Age (5000–3000BC). Characteristics of pottery, tools and weapons confirm cultural connections of indigenous inhabitants of Semberija with the eneolithic and Bronze Age cultures – Vučedol, Kostolac and Baden culture.

Old Slavs and Middle Ages

The oldest archeological site of this period is located on both sides of the Bistrik channel, between the villages of Batković and Ostojićevo and it consists of four smaller sites which date from the period of the 7th to the 12th century. At Jazbina and Oraščić, remains were found of a settlement with half-buried huts, but the most significant discovery was a complex of metallurgical workshop at the site Čelopek where iron was melted in the 8th century and iron tools were manufactured. The oldest religious building, the Tavna Monastery was built in the Middle Ages.The region was  incorporated in to the Bosnian banate during the reign of Stephan  Kotromanić At this time the village Bistrik was called Bistrica and it was the center of the parish, which covered the entire territory of present-day city of Bijeljina. 

The first documented mention of the name Bijeljina occurred in 1446. The city fully fell to the Ottomans in 1530. Following the Great Turkish War, it was incorporated into Austrian possession before being retaken by the Ottomans in 1739. Many of the settlements were decimated as a result of unsuccessful Serb rebellions against the occupation.

Austro-Hungarian rule in Bosnia and Herzegovina rule lasted from 1878 until 1918. The name Bijeljina was only used after 1918 and World War I. During Austro-Hungarian rule, the town had the name Bjelina and, before that, Belina or Bilina.

Modern history
In 1838, the first confessional elementary school was opened. A modern school building was built in 1902. In this school Jovan Dučić, famous Herzegovinian Serb poet, writer and diplomat, worked between 1893 and 1895.

In front of City Hall is a statue of King Peter I of Serbia, who ruled the Kingdom of Serbia between 1903 and 1918. During the Second World War, the Ustaša removed it. After World War II, the communist government refused to return the monument. The first non-communist local government returned the monument in the early 1990s.

Bosnian War

In September 1991, Bosnian Serbs proclaimed a Serbian Autonomous Oblast with Bijeljina as its capital. In March 1992, the Bosnian referendum on independence was passed with overwhelming support from Bosniaks and Bosnian Croats. Local Bosniak Patriotic League had been established in response to the Bosnian Serb proclamation and started the clashes. On 1–2 April, the SDG and the JNA overtook Bijeljina with little resistance; A massacre was carried out and involved the killing of between 48 and 78 civilians by Serb paramilitary groups. The majority of those killed were Bosniaks (or Bosnian Muslims). The dead included members of other ethnicities, such as Serbs deemed unloyal by the local authorities. The killing was committed by a local paramilitary group known as Mirko's Chetniks and by the Serb Volunteer Guard (SDG, also known as Arkan's Tigers), a Serbia-based paramilitary group under the command of the Yugoslav People's Army (JNA).

The village of Batković in the municipality of Bijeljina was the site of the Batković camp, believed to be the first concentration camp in operation during the Bosnian War. It was run by Serbs from 1 April 1992 until late January 1996. The prisoners were predominantly ethnic Bosniaks, who were tortured, sexually assaulted, and killed. A "State Commission for the Free transfer of the Civilian Population" or "Commission for the Exchange of Population" was created and headed by Vojkan Đurković, a Major in the SDG.

Post-war period

Post-war development of Bijeljina is experienced in the late 1990s and the first decade of the 21st century. After a population boom due to war events and population saturation and insufficient capacity of the city that was built in less need, today there is re-building of Bijeljina with new settlements, roads, schools, universities, and cultural institutions.

The Serb Democratic Party (SDS) governed Bijeljina for 28 years since 1992. Following the 2018 Bosnian general election, in March 2020 mayor Mićo Mićić (governing the city since 2004) left the party to found the Party of Democratic Srpska of Semberija (SDSS) and signed a coalition agreement with Milorad Dodik's SNSD. In June 2020, SDSS and SNSD put SDS in minority in the local council. At the 2020 Bosnian municipal elections, SDS's Ljubiša Petrović became the new mayor, succeeding Mićić.

Demographics

Population

Ethnic composition

Architecture

The Atik mosque was built between 1520 and 1566 during the period of Sultan Suleiman the Magnificent, the mosque was completely destroyed on 13 March 1993 and rebuilt where it stood before.

Serbian Orthodox Church (Svetog Đorđa) Saint George which was built in 1872. The second oldest building is the Semberija. Museum which was built in 1876. It is noted that the oldest building in Bijeljina was Atik Mosque in the city centre, built in 1530 and demolished to the ground during the Bosnian War 1992–1995.

Basil of Ostrog Monastery in the center of Bijeljina is a newly built monastery (2001.) Dedicated to St Basil of Ostrog. The bell tower with a clock of over 30 meters dominates the surroundings and a symbol of the monastery. As part of the monastery is a museum, dining room, library, hermitages for monks. Inside the temple is painted magnificent frescoes. It is particularly valuable copy Trojeručica miraculous icons, the gift from Hilandar monastery. In Bijeljina is also located the Holy Temple, the Church of St. Petka, and the old Catholic church.

The Filip Višnjić Library is the oldest cultural institution in Bijeljina - founded in 1932 year, thanks to prominent people and intellectuals. Played a major role in raising the cultural level of the construction and opening of reading rooms in rural villages of Semberija. Now located in a modern building and has over 100,000 books.

The Tavna Monastery is located in the southern part of the Bijeljina municipality. The date of foundation is hidden somewhere in the shadows of the far past. The chronicles of monasteries Tronosha and Pech say it was built by Dragutin's sons Vladislav i Urosic. Stefan Dragutin was the King of Serbia from 1276 to 1282 and king of Srem from 1282 to 1316. The present church of monastery Tavna, is built in the same place as the original one. The Tavna Monastery is older than the other monasteries in the region such as Ozrena, Liplja, Vozuce and Gostovica. Tavna was damaged in the first years of Turkish rule, but was restored by the people. This was not the only time the monastery was damaged. It was damaged many times during the Turkish period and also during World War Two. Between 1941 and 1945, Tavna was bombed by the Ustase. One of the gravestones says "Zdravko Jovanovic Killed 1943 by the Ustasa Blue Division protecting and defending the monastery"; after WWII Tavna was rebuilt.

Education

The first primary school in Bijeljina was opened in 1938. After World War II, changes were made to the school system, and in 1951 the first elementary school was opened. In 1956, a second elementary school was opened. The third and fourth elementary schools opened in 1959 and 1966, respectively.

Since 1953, a basic music school has been operating in the city. 

Primary schools in Bijeljina include the following: OŠ Sveti Sava, OŠ Kinez Ivo od Semberije, OŠ Vuk Karadžić, OŠ Jovan Dučić. There are several high schools operating in the city, such as Filip Višnjić Gymnasium, Stevan Stojanovic Mokranjac Music School, an agricultural high school, a medicine highschool, an economic and a technical school. The University of Bijeljina has several faculties: Law, Economics, Business Economics and Education. The main private universities in the city are Slobomir P University and University Sinergija.

Economy

The following table gives a preview of total number of registered people employed in legal entities per their core activity (as of 2018):

Transportation

The road network is dependent on the main routes: the M-14.1 Brcko-Zvornik and the M-18 Raca-Ugljevik. 
The complete road network in contact with the city and the urban traffic network is extremely radial orientation. She had eleven major transportation routes, which link directly to the city. Around the city is located bypass, but isn't completed. The main bus station in Bijeljina is located in the central zone of the city. The main bus station in Bijeljina is owned by Semberija Transport. From Bijeljina passengers can travel to other cities in the region as well as some cities in Europe such as Ljubljana, Vienna, Berlin, Munich, Zürich, Stockholm. There is only one railway line in Bijeljina. That railway line stretches from Bijeljina to Šid in Serbia. From Šid it joins another line going east towards Belgrade or going west to Croatia.

Public transport
The main public transport system in Bijeljina is made up of bus routes that provide transportation from surrounding villages to the city center. Public passenger transport performed in Bijeljina 50 buses. There are 12 lines of public transport in the city. Price of one-way ticket is 1.5 convertible mark = 75 euro cents

Bus routes

Distances
Sarajevo: ;
Belgrade: ;
Banja Luka: ;
Vienna: ;
Budapest: ;
Zagreb: .

Tourism

Bijeljina holds an international folklore festival known as Semberija folk fest

The Dvorovi Spa is one of the most famous spas in the Republika Srpska. The Dvorovi Spa was formed after the discovery of thermal water drilling for oil exploration 1957th in Semberija. The depth of the source is at 1435 meters, the water is oligomineral, and the thermal temperature is 75°S.

Sports

Bijeljina has one major stadium known as Bijeljina City Stadium. The Stadium is home to FK Radnik Bijeljina, which competes in the Premier League of Bosnia and Herzegovina. Radnik won the Bosnian Cup in 2016. Their president is Predrag Perković and their manager is Vlado Jagodić.

OFK Zenit Bijeljina is a young club from Bijeljina but their youth teams had earned a lot of medals in Bosnia and Herzegovina, Serbia, Slovenia, Romania, Austria, Germany. Their stadium is ‘Zenit Arena’ in Novo Selo, 5 min from the city center. OFK Zenit competes in the leagues of Football Association of Republika Srpska (FSRS). They have the contract with Zvijezda 09 (team in Premier League BiH) to Zenit's youth teams play like Zvijezda 09's players.

Bijeljina was designated European city of sport in 2020.

Basketball clubs include:
KK Budućnost Bijeljina;
KK Radnik Bijeljina;
KK Fenix Basket Bijeljina.

Volleyball clubs include:
OK Radnik Bijeljina;
OK Libero Bijeljina.

Handball clubs include:
RK Bijeljina;
ZRK Bijeljina.

Twin towns – sister cities

Bijeljina is twinned with:

Azov, Russia
Brașov, Romania
Budva, Montenegro
Goraždevac, Kosovo
Kosjerić, Serbia
Kruševac, Serbia
Kumanovo, North Macedonia
Langenhagen, Germany
Leskovac, Serbia
Ruse, Bulgaria
Zrenjanin, Serbia

Notable people

Admir Smajić, footballer, Olympic bronze medalist
Ana Mirjana Račanović, Miss Bosnia and Herzegovina 2001
Bego Ćatić, footballer
Cvijetin Mijatović, Chairman of the Collective Presidency of Yugoslavia, Yugoslav People's Hero
Darko Todorović, Bosnian footballer
Duško Kondor, human rights activist, professor of sociology and philosophy
Filip Višnjić, epic poet
Frenkie, rapper
Luka Jović, Serbian footballer
Mirko Ilić, Serbian graphic designer and comics artist
Mirza Begić, Slovenian basketball player
Nevenka Tadić, neuropsychiatrist and mother of former president of Serbia Boris Tadić
Nihad Hrustanbegovic, composer, accordionist and pianist 
Miloš Bojanić, folk singer
Rodoljub Čolaković, politician and writer
Rodoljub Roki Vulović, Bosnian Serb singer, author, performer, former professor, and former school director
Srđan Vuletić, filmmaker
Cican Stankovic, Austrian footballer
Savo Milošević, Serbian footballer, UEFA Euro 2000 Top scorer
Svetozar Marković (footballer), Serbian footballer

Notes

See also
Janja
Semberija
Slobomir

References

External links

Bijeljina danas

 
Populated places in Bijeljina
Municipalities of Republika Srpska